The following is a list of songs recorded by South Korean girl group Red Velvet. As of December 2022, the girl group has released 119 songs.



Songs recorded

References

Red Velvet